ULEB Cup 2007–08 Final  was the championship game of 2007–08 ULEB Cup played at the Torino Palavela in Turin, Italy. The final was won by DKV Joventut who beat Akasvayu Girona 79–54.  It was the first time in ULEB Cup that two clubs from the same country competed in the final.

Final

Game Stats
Game Stats, Final Akasvayu Girona

Notes: # - Player number; Min played - Minutes played; Points - FT: Free Throws, 2FG: 2-point Field Goals, 3FG: 3-point Field Goals, TOT: Total points; Rebounds - Off: Offensive, Def: Defensive, TOT: Total rebounds; Blocks - Fv: In Favor, Ag: Against; Fouls - Cm: Committed, Rv: Received; Players in bold were in starters

Game Stats, Final DKV Joventut

Notes: # - Player number; Min played - Minutes played; Points - FT: Free Throws, 2FG: 2-point Field Goals, 3FG: 3-point Field Goals, TOT: Total points; Rebounds - Off: Offensive, Def: Defensive, TOT: Total rebounds; Blocks - Fv: In Favor, Ag: Against; Fouls - Cm: Committed, Rv: Received; Players in bold were in starters

External links
2007–08 ULEB Cup Final Eight

Final
2007
2007–08 in Italian basketball
2007–08 in Spanish basketball